Rasmus Ling (born 1984) is a Swedish politician.  he serves as Member of the Riksdag. He represents the constituency of Malmö Municipality. He is affiliated with the Green Party.

He was also elected as Member of the Riksdag in September 2022.

References 

Living people
1984 births
People from Östersund
21st-century Swedish politicians
Members of the Riksdag 2014–2018
Members of the Riksdag 2018–2022
Members of the Riksdag 2022–2026
Members of the Riksdag from the Green Party